Atal Bihari Vajpayee was sworn in as Prime Minister of India for second time on 19 March 1998. Here is the list of ministers in his ministry.

Council of ministers

Cabinet ministers

|}

Ministers of State

External links

References

Indian union ministries
Vajpayee administration
1998 establishments in India
1999 disestablishments in India
Cabinets established in 1998
Cabinets disestablished in 1999
Atal Bihari Vajpayee
Bharatiya Janata Party
Samata Party
Shiromani Akali Dal
All India Anna Dravida Munnetra Kazhagam
Pattali Makkal Katchi
Biju Janata Dal
Shiv Sena